David James Mossman (10 September 1926 – 5 April 1971) was a British journalist, broadcaster, TV reporter, film-maker, interviewer and former MI6 agent.

Career 
With producer David Webster, he made two notable programmes about the 1964 US presidential election: A Choice or an Echo, about the differences between Lyndon Johnson and Barry Goldwater; and Thunder on the Left, about the Right-wingers surrounding Goldwater. He was a member of the Panorama team in the 1960s specialising in foreign affairs, with a famously acerbic interviewing style. He once verbally attacked then-Prime Minister Harold Wilson live on air, over his support of US President Lyndon Johnson over the Vietnam War. On another occasion, he took the Singapore prime minister to task for his habit of throwing his political opponents in jail. Eventually, he was reassigned to presenting regular arts slot by the BBC because of the controversy around his interviewing style.

Personal life 
As a high profile news reporter but closteted gay man in an era where homosexuality was outlawed, by the mid-1960s Mossman fell in love with Canadian Louis Hanssen. Hanssen was married to a woman and eight years younger than Mossman, however this didn't stop a relationship forming between the two. Hanssen died in 1968 of an accidental overdose. Their relationship gave rise to speculation with work colleagues of Mossman, who described Hanssen as domineering in their relationship.

Death 

In 1971, Mossman committed suicide in his cottage in Norfolk by taking a fatal overdose of barbiturates, leaving behind a note that read: "I can't bear it any more, though I don't know what 'it' is."

In popular culture

Peter Shaffer, the author of the play Equus, claimed that during a stay at the Norfolk cottage, Mossman, of whom he was a friend, told him the story on which he based the play.

On 14 February 2007, The Reporter, a play by Nicholas Wright based on his book and directed by Richard Eyre, premiered at the Royal National Theatre in London. The play explores the social climate in the years before Mossman's death as well as the reasons for the death itself.

Bibliography 
 Rebels in paradise : Indonesia's civil war, Jonathan Cape publishers, 1961, ISBN B0007KG0SE
 Beggars on horseback. Little Brown, 1966, ISBN B0007DRYJ0 - winner of the Author's Club First Novel Award
 Love, Love, Love, BBC, 1967, ISBN B0007K7YY8
 Lifelines, Bodley Head, 1971,

References

External links 
 The Real Jim, The Guardian, 3 February 2007
 Interview with Nicholas Wright, Financial Times, 16 February 2007
 Slot on Mossman and the play The Reporter on BBC Radio 4's programme, The World Tonight - 22 February 2007

1926 births
1971 suicides
BBC newsreaders and journalists
British broadcast news analysts
British male journalists
British reporters and correspondents
Drug-related suicides in England
Barbiturates-related deaths
English television presenters
English LGBT broadcasters
English LGBT journalists
20th-century LGBT people